The 1984–85 Divizia B was the 45th season of the second tier of the Romanian football league system.

The format has been maintained to three series, each of them having 18 teams. At the end of the season the winners of the series promoted to Divizia A and the last four places from each series relegated to Divizia C.

Team changes

To Divizia B
Promoted from Divizia C
 CFR Pașcani
 FEPA 74 Bârlad
 Metalul Mangalia
 Mizil
 MF Steaua București
 Flacăra-Automecanica Moreni
 Drobeta-Turnu Severin
 Mureșul Deva
 Strungul Arad
 Sticla Arieșul Turda
 Unirea Alba Iulia
 Tractorul Brașov

Relegated from Divizia A
 Dunărea CSU Galați
 Petrolul Ploiești
 CS Târgoviște

From Divizia B
Relegated to Divizia C
 Delta Tulcea
 Nitramonia Făgăraș
 CFR Caransebeș
 Borzești
 ROVA Roșiori
 Steaua CFR Cluj
 Unirea Slobozia
 Constructorul Craiova
 Someșul Satu Mare
 Dunărea Călărași
 Chimia Turnu MăgureleRapid Arad

Promoted to Divizia A
 Gloria Buzău
 FCM Brașov
 Politehnica Timișoara

Renamed teams
AS Mizil was renamed as Steaua Mizil.

Mureșul Deva was renamed as Mureșul Explorări Deva.

Prahova Ploiești was renamed as Prahova CSU Ploiești.

League tables

Serie I

Serie II

Serie III

See also 
 1984–85 Divizia A

References

Liga II seasons
Romania
2